Fannia pellucida is a species of fly in the family Fanniidae.

References

Fanniidae
Articles created by Qbugbot
Insects described in 1898